Lashio Airport  is an airport in Lashio, Myanmar. it is near the headquarters of Northeast Military Command.

Airlines and destinations

Accidents and incident
On 23 May 1969, Douglas DC-3 XY-ACR of Union of Burma Airways crashed on approach to Lashio Airport, killing all six people on board. The aircraft was operating a domestic non-scheduled passenger flight.

References

Airports in Myanmar